Pedro Rabelo de Souza Airport  is the airport serving Paracatu, Brazil.

It is operated by Infracea.

Airlines and destinations

Access

See also

List of airports in Brazil

References

External links

Airports in Minas Gerais